Stanley Li Sai-wing,  is a Hong Kong DAB politician who is the elected Legislative Council member for New Territories South East.

Electoral history

References 

Living people
HK LegCo Members 2022–2025
Hong Kong pro-Beijing politicians
1983 births